is a Japanese manga series written and illustrated by Abi Umeda. The manga is licensed in North America by Viz Media. An anime television series adaptation by J.C. Staff aired in Japan from October to December 2017, and was released globally on Netflix in March 2018.

Synopsis
The story focuses on a boy called Chakuro, who lives on a giant vessel called a Mud Whale that drifts over the sea of sand. In the Mud Whale, society is divided into two kinds of people: the Marked, who can move objects with their minds using a strange power called "thymia", at the expense of shortened lifespans, and the Unmarked, people who lack thymia but enjoy longer lifespans. Chakuro and his friends have never seen anyone from the outside world, and they spend their days yearning to explore and learn about it. In year 93 of the vessel's exile, the Mud Whale encounters a lonely island and Chakuro finds a girl inside, starting an adventure that changes the lives of everyone.

Characters

The protagonist and narrator of the story. Chakuro is a Marked boy who works as an archivist for the Elders in the Mud Whale hoping that his records will improve life for future generations. Curious and gentled  he sometimes dreams to see the world outside the Mud Whale and immediately befriends Lykos after finding her on the abandoned island. 

 
A mysterious girl found on an island that was about to be scavenged by the Mud Whale's people for resources. "Lykos" is not really her name, it actually refers to a mysterious creature that feeds off the emotions of anyone that comes near it. Chakuro simply calls her "Lykos" for the sake of convenience. She is at first reluctant to speak to anyone, but with Chakuro's help she learns to express herself more openly. It is revealed that she is an Apathetia, a thymia user that offers its emotions to a Nous and the younger sister of Orca, a high ranking member of the Allied Empire. She chooses to stay on the Mud Whale and teaches them how to fight.

A Marked boy who is said to possess the greatest potential for thymia in the Mud Whale. He is the leader of the Moles, a group of young people who gained their name because they often break the rules of the Mud Whale and thus spent a lot of time imprisoned in the belly of the ship. Obsessed with leaving the Mud Whale, Ouni has earned a reputation as a troublemaker. When Lykos is found by Chakuro, Ouni sees the opportunity to escape the Mud Whale. During the second invasion by the Allied Empire, he sneaks onto enemy ship with Chakuro, Nibi, Lykos, and Ginshu. After seeing Nibi die, he awakens an unknown power that allows him to use thymia in the belly of Skyros and subsequently destroys it. It is suspected that he is a Daimonas, a thymia user with the ability to destroy Nouses.

An Unmarked man who worked as an assistant for the Council of Elders and was researching a way to extend the life of the Marked. He is Chakuro's friend and Sami's elder brother, he often gives them advice for how they can help the Mud Whale's people. He often clasps his hands, which Chakuro notes is his way to suppress his emotions. He was appointed Mayor of the Mud Whale after the initial invasion by Skyros and told to sink the ship. After refusing he was thrown into jail.

A girl who often helps in the everyday activities of the Mud Whale's people, as a member of the Vigilante Corps. She is energetic and calls Chakuro "Chakky."

 
An Apatheia of the Allied Empire who stands out for his excessive emotions. He is sadistic and takes pleasure in killing the citizens of the Mud Whale due to their capacity for emotion. During the invasion he was defeated by Shaun, but managed to escape back to the Empire.

 
A mysterious man and the former leader of the Vigilante Corps. He follows Suoh and other Unmarked members of the Mud Whale.

 
Chakuro's friend and Suō's younger sister. She seems to harbor feelings for Chakuro and becomes mildly jealous of Lykos upon seeing how close she and Chakuro become. When a mysterious group of soldiers attack the Mud Whale, she shields Chakuro from their bullets and dies. She returns as a spirit, kisses, and confesses her feelings to Chakuro before disappearing.

 (English) 
A girl, member of the Moles.

 (English)
An Unmarked woman and former mayor of the Mud Whale.

Media

Manga
Abi Umeda launched the series in the July 2013 issue of Akita Shoten's shojo manga magazine Monthly Mystery Bonita on June 6, 2013. The series has been collected into 22 volumes as of August 2022. The series will end serialization on January 6, 2023. Viz Media announced during their panel at Anime Boston 2017 that they have licensed the manga.

A comedy spin-off manga series was serialized in Monthly Mystery Bonita magazine from April 2018 to June 5, 2021.

Anime
An anime adaptation of the series was announced in the February 2017 issue of Mystery Bonita on January 6, 2017. The anime adaptation, which was later confirmed to be a television series, is directed by Kyōhei Ishiguro and written by Michiko Yokote, with animation by J.C.Staff, character designs by Haruko Iizuka and music by Hiroaki Tsutsumi. It aired from October 8 to December 24, 2017, on Tokyo MX and other channels. It ran for 12 episodes and will have two OVA. It was released globally by Netflix in March 2018. The opening theme song  is performed by singer-songwriter RIRIKO, while the ending theme song  is performed by rionos.

Notes

References

External links
 
 

2013 manga
2017 anime television series debuts
Akita Shoten manga
Dystopian anime and manga
Fiction set on desert planets
J.C.Staff
Netflix original anime
Post-apocalyptic anime and manga
Science fantasy anime and manga
Shōjo manga
Viz Media manga